Riverside ferry wharf is located on the northern side of the Brisbane River serving the serving the Brisbane central business district in Queensland, Australia. It is served by RiverCity Ferries' CityCat services. From 15 November 2020 it is also being served by CityHopper and Cross River services.

Location 
It is part of the Riverside Centre and immediately adjacent to the Brisbane Stock Exchange.

History 
The wharf sustained moderate damage during the January 2011 Brisbane floods. It reopened after repairs on 14 February 2011.

References

External links

Brisbane central business district
Ferry wharves in Brisbane